Lem Dobbs (born Anton Lemuel Kitaj; 24 December 1958) is a British-American screenwriter, best known for the films Dark City (1998) and The Limey (1999). He was born in Oxford, England, and is the son of the painter R. B. Kitaj. The pen name "Dobbs" was taken from the character played by Humphrey Bogart in The Treasure of the Sierra Madre (1948).

Career
Dobbs's earliest work in the film industry was as a child actor in The Boy Who Turned Yellow (1972), a short film that was the last collaboration between director Michael Powell and the screenwriter/producer Emeric Pressburger.

In 1979, Dobbs wrote Edward Ford, an original screenplay that remains unproduced. Critic Matthew Dessem has called the script "famously brilliant, famously unproduced", and asserts that "most of Hollywood" agrees it is a "masterpiece". On the basis of another unproduced screenplay, The Marvel of the Haunted Castle, Dobbs was hired to rewrite Diane Thomas's screenplay for Romancing the Stone (1984), though his contributions went uncredited.

Following that film's success, several films based on Dobbs's screenplays were produced: Hider in the House (1989), The Hard Way (1991), Kafka (1991), which Dobbs wrote in the 1970s, and The Limey (1999). He was also credited as co-writer on Dark City (1998), The Score (2001), and Haywire (2012), an action-thriller directed by Steven Soderbergh (who also directed Kafka and The Limey).

Dobbs has spoken on DVD commentary tracks for his films Dark City and The Limey, and (as a film historian) for the unrelated "In the French Style" (1963), Von Ryan's Express (1965), The Sand Pebbles (1966), and Double Indemnity (1945), the last due to his personal friendship with the director Billy Wilder.

Filmography

Feature films

Awards and nominations

References

External links
Hollywood: Lem Dobbs

1958 births
British emigrants to the United States
American male screenwriters
English screenwriters
English male screenwriters
Living people
People from Oxford